Pope John XXII (1316–1334) created 28 new cardinals in six consistories:

18 December 1316
Bernard de Castanet, bishop of Le Puy  – cardinal-bishop of Porto e S. Rufina, † 14 August 1317.
Jacques de Via, nephew of John XXII, bishop Avignon – cardinal-priest of SS. Giovanni e Paolo, †  13 June 1317.
Gauscelin de Jean, relative of John XXII – cardinal-priest of SS. Marcellino e Pietro, then cardinal-bishop of Albano (18 December 1327), †   3 August 1348.
Bertrand du Pouget – cardinal-priest of S. Marcello, then cardinal-bishop of Ostia e Velletri (18 December 1327), †  3 February 1352.
Pierre d'Arrabloy – cardinal-priest of S. Susanna (received the title on 29 March 1317), then cardinal-bishop of Porto e S. Rufina (18 December 1327), †  in March 1331.
Bertrand de Montfavez – cardinal-deacon of S. Maria in Aquiro, †  1 December 1342.
Gaillard de la Mothe – cardinal-deacon of S. Lucia in Silice, †  20 December 1356.
Gian Gaetano Orsini – cardinal-deacon of S. Teodoro, †  27 August 1335.

20 June 1317
Arnaud de Via, nephew of John XXII – cardinal-deacon of S. Eustachio, †  24 November 1335.

20  December 1320
The new cardinals received their titles probably in February 1321:
Regnaud de la Porte, archbishop of Bourges – cardinal-priest of SS. Nereo ed Achilleo, then cardinal-bishop of Ostia e Velletri (1 August 1321), †  in August 1325.
Bertrand de la Tour, O.F.M., archbishop of Salerno – cardinal-priest of S. Vitale, then cardinal-bishop of Tusculum (1323), †  1333
Pierre Desprès, archbishop of Aix – cardinal-priest of S. Pudenziana, then cardinal-bishop of Palestrina (10 May 1322), †  16 May 1361.
Simon d'Archiac, archbishop-elect of Vienne – cardinal-priest of S. Prisca, †  14 May 1323.
Pilfort de Rabastens, O.S.B., bishop of Rieux – cardinal-priest of S. Anastasia, †  14 July 1324
Pierre Le Tessier, C.R.S.A. – cardinal-priest of S. Stefano al Monte Celio, †  22 March 1325.
Raymond Le Roux – cardinal-deacon of S. Maria in Cosmedin, †  31 October 1325.

18 December 1327
Jean-Raymond de Comminges, archbishop of Toulouse – cardinal-priest of S. Vitale, then cardinal-bishop of Porto e S. Rufina (15 March 1331), †  20 November 1348
Annibaldo di Ceccano, archbishop of Naples – cardinal-priest of S. Lorenzo in Lucina, then cardinal-bishop of Tusculum (February 1333), †  17 July 1350.
Jacques Fournier, O.Cist., bishop of Mirapoix – cardinal-priest of S. Prisca, then Pope Benedict XII (20 December 1334), †  25 April 1342
Raymond de Mostuéjouls, O.S.B., bishop of St.-Papoul – cardinal-priest of S. Eusebio, †  12 November 1337.
Pierre de Mortemart, bishop of Auxerre – cardinal-priest of S. Stefano al Monte Celio, †  14 April 1335.
Pierre des Chappes, bishop of Chartres – cardinal-priest of SS. Silvestro e Martino, †  24 March 1336.
Matteo Orsini di Monte Giordano, O.P., archbishop of Manfredonia – cardinal-priest of SS. Giovanni e Paolo, then cardinal-bishop of Sabina (18 December 1338), †  18 August 1340.
Pedro Gómez Barroso, bishop of Cartagena – cardinal-priest of S. Prassede, then cardinal-bishop of Sabina (1340), †  14 July 1348.
Imbert Dupuis – cardinal-priest of SS. XII Apostoli, †  26 May 1348.
Giovanni Colonna – cardinal-deacon of S. Angelo in Pescheria, †  3 July 1348.

25 May 1331
Hélie de Talleyrand-Périgord – cardinal-priest of S. Pietro in Vincoli (received the title in June 1331), then cardinal-bishop of Albano (4 November 1348) †  17 January 1364.

20 December 1331
Pierre Bertrand d'Annonay, bishop of Autun – cardinal-priest of S. Clemente, †  23 June 1348.

Sources
 Konrad Eubel: Hierarchia Catholica, I, Münster 1913
 Etienne Blauze: Vitae paparum avenionensium, vols. I-II, ed. G. Mollat, 1914

 Lettres communes

John XXII
College of Cardinals
 Jo
Cardinals